Kermit Unpigged is a comedy album released by The Jim Henson Company through BMG Kidz in 1994, and the last album released by Jim Henson Records. The record's title is a parody of the MTV series MTV Unplugged, and the cover is a parody of Eric Clapton's Unplugged album cover as well. The album consists of Kermit the Frog and the other Muppets getting lost at a recording studio and encountering celebrities including Linda Ronstadt, with whom Kermit sings "All I Have to Do Is Dream", Vince Gill who sings "Daydream" with Kermit, Jimmy Buffett who sings "Mr. Spaceman" with Gonzo, and Ozzy Osbourne with whom Miss Piggy sings "Born to Be Wild". The album ends with the Muppets meeting back up and singing the Beatles song "All Together Now".

The album reached #20 on Billboards Top Kid Audio chart.

Track listing
 "She Drives Me Crazy" - Kermit the Frog and Miss Piggy
 "Daydream" - Vince Gill and Kermit the Frog
 "On Broadway" - George Benson, Clifford and the Rhythm Rats
 "All I Have to Do Is Dream" - Linda Ronstadt and Kermit the Frog
 "Born to Be Wild" - Ozzy Osbourne and Miss Piggy
 "Mr. Spaceman" - Jimmy Buffett, The Great Gonzo and Rizzo the Rat
 "Bein' Green" - Don Henley and Kermit the Frog
 "Wild Thing" - Animal, Floyd Pepper and Kermit the Frog
 "Can't Get Along Without You" - Kermit the Frog and Robin 
 "All Together Now" - The Muppets with Harry Smith

References 

1994 albums
The Muppets albums
1990s comedy albums